Lydia Seyram Alhassan (born 1 January 1970) is a Ghanaian politician and member of the Seventh Parliament of the Fourth Republic of Ghana representing the Ayawaso West Wuogon Constituency in the Greater Accra Region on the ticket of the New Patriotic Party.

Education 
She holds an MBA in Marketing from the University of Ghana Business School, Legon and Bachelor of Administration degree from Ghana the Institute of Management and Public Administration (GIMPA).

Politics 
In January 2019, Alhassan contested the parliamentary seat for the Ayawaso West Wuogon Constituency, running to replace her late husband. She won the election with 68.80 per cent of the valid votes cast. The other candidates, Kwasi Delali Brempong of the opposition National Democratic Congress (NDC) polled 30.52 per cent, William Kofi Dowokpor of the Progressive People's Party (PPP) polled 0.58 per cent, and Clement Boadi of the Liberal Party of Ghana (LPG) polled 0.10 per cent.

She successfully contested in the 2020 Ghanaian general election under the ticket of New Patriotic Party and won against Ghanaian celebrity and NDC candidateJohn Dumelo, polling 9,851 of the valid votes cast.

Personal life 
She was married to late politician Emmanuel Boakye Agyarko until his death in 2018.

References

Ghanaian MPs 2017–2021
New Patriotic Party politicians
Living people
Ghanaian MPs 2021–2025
1970 births